Mount Macey is an isolated peak  high, about  southeast of the Stinear Nunataks in Mac. Robertson Land, Antarctica. It was sighted in 1954 by an Australian National Antarctic Research Expeditions party led by R.G. Dovers, and named for L.E. Macey, technical superintendent at Mawson Station in 1954.

References

Mountains of Mac. Robertson Land